Welcome the Worms is the second studio album by American punk rock band Bleached. It was released in April 2016 under Dead Oceans Records.

Track list

References

2016 albums
Bleached (band) albums
Dead Oceans albums
Albums produced by Carlos de la Garza (music producer)
Albums produced by Joe Chiccarelli